Bahrain participated in the 15th Asian Games, officially known as the XV Asiad held in Doha, Qatar from 1 to 15 December 2006. Bahrain ranked 14th with 7 gold medals in this edition of the Asiad.

Medalists

References

Nations at the 2006 Asian Games
2006
Asian Games